Jalan Kampung Poh (Perak state route A132) is a major road in Perak, Malaysia. It is also a main route to North–South Expressway Northern Route via Bidor Interchange.

List of junctions

Kampung Poh